Founded in 2006, Jon Bon Jovi Soul Foundation (formerly the Philadelphia Soul Charitable Foundation) is a  501(c)(3) non-profit organization that focuses its efforts on the issues of hunger and homelessness in the United States. They work with non-profit organizations and community leaders to help establish programs and partnerships that provide the basic needs of food and shelter. In addition, they also look to add green elements into every project that they support including using green building materials and energy-efficient appliances.

While providing affordable housing to those in need, projects often selected by the Jon Bon Jovi Soul Foundation include additional programs to assist the residents in getting back on the right path.

History
The JBJ Soul Foundation officially launched on October 5, 2006, with the announcement made by Jon Bon Jovi at a press conference in North Philadelphia. At the same press conference, it was announced that the Soul Foundation would partner with Sister Mary Scullion and Project H.O.M.E. to rebuild and refurbish 15 homes right on that same block they were standing on.

Partnerships
The Foundation has partnered with numerous charity organizations since its inception, including different chapters of Habitat for Humanity, Sister Mary Scullion, Project H.O.M.E. in Philadelphia and in Atlanta, and the Tiger Woods Foundation to build homes and provide housing, healthcare, education, and food for those in need, including the homeless and victims of domestic violence.

Programs

References

External links
Official JBJ Soul Foundation Website

Sources
http://www.washingtonpost.com/wp-dyn/content/article/2006/10/06/AR2006100600789.html
http://www.nj.com/gloucester/index.ssf?/base/news-13/125601630570950.xml&coll=8
http://www.habitat.org/newsroom/2007archive/04_04_2007_Delta_NY_Build.aspx

501(c)(3) organizations
Organizations based in Philadelphia
Homelessness charities
Jon Bon Jovi